The Aurora Pulsed Radiation Simulator (also known as the Aurora flash x-ray simulator) is a 14 TW flash gamma-ray simulator that was designed to simulate the effects of a nuclear weapon's bremsstrahlung, or gamma radiation, pulses on military electronic systems. It was built in 1971 by the U.S. Defense Atomic Support Agency (DASA), which eventually became the Defense Threat Reduction Agency, and the U.S. Department of Energy (DOE).

It was also one of only four large machines in the United States that were built specifically to test complete nuclear weapons packages, with the other three being the Hermes I to III simulators at Sandia Base, New Mexico. Situated at the Harry Diamond Laboratories (which later became a part of the Army Research Laboratory) in Adelphi, Maryland, it was used to test complete weapons electronics packages from the warheads of intercontinental ballistic missiles (ICBMs) to satellites. After more than 20 years of use during the Cold War, the Aurora Simulator was officially decommissioned and disassembled in 1996.

In 1986, the Aurora facility set the world record for the largest amount of high-power microwave power generated from a virtual cathode oscillator. As a result, HDL was recognized by the American Defense Preparedness Association (ADPA) in 1987.

History 
Following the use of the atomic bomb in World War II, studies on flash radiography found that field emission flash x-rays, which were previously used to analyze explosions, could simulate radiation from a nuclear bomb. Given this realization, the U.S. military began to prioritize the development of flash x-ray machines to test parts of missile packages during the 1960s.

After the Soviet Union demonstrated the use of the world's first anti-ballistic missiles (ABM) in 1964, DASA launched a series of projects in response that aimed to hasten the advancement of nuclear effects laboratories in the United States. The U.S. military was concerned that the introduction and subsequent nuclear explosion of Soviet AMBs into the airspace would increase the likelihood of the resulting radiation interfering with the electronics systems of inbound U.S. ICBMs. In order to thoroughly harden U.S. missiles, DASA initiated the construction of the Aurora Simulator as well as a full-threat level facility that engaged in gamma radiation testing and missile refinement in 1969.

When selecting the site for the Aurora facility, DASA wanted the gamma radiation simulator to be situated at an existing military laboratory. After much deliberation between the Air Force Weapons Laboratory (AFWL) in New Mexico and the Army and Navy laboratories in the Washington, D.C. area, DASA chose the latter and granted the Harry Diamond Laboratory (HDL) the responsibility of operating the facility. In order to house the Aurora Simulator, HDL moved from its downtown Washington, D.C. site to an area of land in White Oak, Maryland, which would eventually become the now-present Adelphi.

The cooperation between DASA and HDL on the Aurora project led to many HDL researchers becoming involved in the simulator's development, including assistant to DASA Deputy Director for Science and Technology Peter Haas and former participant in the Manhattan Project Paul Caldwell, who later was placed in charge of the Aurora Simulator. In turn, Caldwell hired physicist Alexander Stewart from Ion Physics (IP) and HDL's Robert Lamb and Dennis Whittaker, the four of whom (including Caldwell) made up the bulk of the research and development team for the Aurora project. The construction of the Aurora Simulator was completed in January 1971, costing about $16 million, and the first test was conducted on the Spartan ABM flight control set in April 1972. Throughout its entire run at HDL, which ended in 1995, the Aurora Simulator conducted 287 numbered tests, resulting in more than 9,100 test shots.

Operation 
The Aurora Pulsed Radiation Simulator consisted of four 14 MV Marx generators, each of which contained four parallel 1.25 MJ units connected together to drive four parallel oil-dielectric Blumlein pulse-forming lines (PFLs). Each PFL was coupled with an E-beam diode.

The Aurora Simulator emitted four short pulses of high energy bremsstrahlung radiation that overlapped to deliver a single 120 ns wide pulse of 20 to 50 krads (Si) into a 1m cube. It could also deliver 25 krads (Si) throughout a 1m diameter and 1m long cylindrical volume or 50 krads (Si) throughout a 25 cm sphere. What made the Aurora Simulator unique was its ability to provide an extremely high volumetric dose output. Due to this large irradiation volume, dose measurements ranged up to 200 locations within a single electronics system. However, in order to obtain the desired radiation levels, all four 8-MeV, 230-kA bremsstrahlung pulses had to overlay within 10 ns. This synchronization was made possible by the symmetrization of the four Blumleins. During active testing, the Aurora Simulator was capable of accommodating as many as 13 test shots in a single day. In comparison, nuclear weapons testing at the Nevada Test Site was limited to one test shot per three months.

There were two main limitations to the operation of the Aurora Simulator. First, the long discharge time of the Blumeins often hindered the extraction of the bremsstrahlung pulses. Second, the high internal impedance of the Blumeins made them rather inefficient for energy transfer to low impedance loads.

References 

Nuclear research institutes
Military research of the United States
Military technology
Pulsed power
Electronics manufacturing
Radiation effects